Kaamos may refer to:

 Kaamos, a word in the Finnish language for Polar night
 Kaamos (Swedish band), a Swedish death metal band
 Kaamos (Kaamos album), 2002
 Kaamos (Finnish band), a Finnish progressive rock band
 Kaamos (Thomas Köner album), 1998
 "Kaamos", a song by Sentenced from the 1998 album Frozen
 "Kaamos", a song by Apocalyptica from the 2000 album Cult